Marc de Rougemont (born 24 May 1972, Aubagne, Bouches-du-Rhône) is a French rugby union footballer. He plays as a hooker. His nickname is "Le Rouge" (The Red).

De Rougemont first played at RC Toulon, from 1991/92 to 1997/98. He won the title of French Champion in 1991/92. He then spent two seasons at CA Bordeaux-Bègles Gironde. He moved back to RC Toulon for the season of 2000/01. He would play at Pays d'Aix RC for five seasons, from 2001/02 to 2005/06. After a brief stint at Marseille Provence XV, he signed with US La Seigne, where he plays since 2007/08, at Fédérale 1.

The French international had 13 caps for France, never scoring, from 1995 to 1997. He was selected for the 1995 Rugby World Cup, playing a single match in the 54-18 win of Côte d'Ivoire. He played at the Five Nations, in 1995, 1996 and 1997, winning it in 1997, with a Grand Slam.

External links
Marc de Rougemont International Matches

1972 births
Living people
People from Aubagne
French rugby union players
Rugby union hookers
France international rugby union players
Sportspeople from Bouches-du-Rhône
CA Bordeaux-Bègles Gironde players
RC Toulonnais players
Provence Rugby players